The 1930–31 Rugby Football League season was the 36th season of rugby league football.

Season summary

Swinton won their third Championship when they defeated Leeds 14-7 in the play-off final. They had also finished the regular season as league leaders.

The Challenge Cup Winners were Halifax who beat York 22-8.

The format of the competition was changed so that all clubs played the same number of matches, and percentages were done away with.

Swinton won the Lancashire League, and Leeds won the Yorkshire League. St Helens Recs beat Wigan 18–3 to win the Lancashire County Cup, and Leeds beat Huddersfield 10–2 to win the Yorkshire County Cup.

Championship

Championship play-off

Challenge Cup

Halifax beat York 22-8 in the final at Wembley before a crowd of 40,368.

This was Halifax’s third Challenge Cup final win in four Cup Final appearances.

To date this was the only Challenge Cup Final appearance by York.

References

Sources
1930-31 Rugby Football League season at wigan.rlfans.com
The Challenge Cup at The Rugby Football League website

1930 in English rugby league
1931 in English rugby league
Northern Rugby Football League seasons